Macy is a female given name, which means "weapon" in Old French. Other spelling variations of the name include Macie, Macey, and Maci. The name's popularity increased after Rowland Macy founded the Macy's chain of department stores. The name Macy may refer to:

People
Macy Chan (born 1981), Hong Kong actress
Macy DuBois (1929–2007), Canadian architect 
Macy Gray (born 1967), American singer
Macy Morse (1921–2019), American political activist
Macy Nulman (1923–2011), American scholar

Fiction
Macy Halbert, a character from the series Nexo Knights
Macy Alexander, fictional character on the American television series The Bold and the Beautiful
 Macy Vaughn, fictional character from the 2018 reboot series Charmed

See also
Macy (surname)
Macy's, American department store chain
Maisie (given name)

English feminine given names
Given names originating from a surname
Feminine given names